The Air Force Museum of New Zealand, formerly called The Royal New Zealand Air Force Museum, is located at Wigram, the RNZAF's first operational base, in Christchurch, in the South Island of New Zealand. It opened on 1 April 1987 as part of the celebrations for the RNZAF's 50th anniversary, and is primarily a museum of the Royal New Zealand Air Force, its predecessor, the New Zealand Permanent Air Force and New Zealand squadrons of the Royal Air Force. The Air Force Museum of New Zealand's mission is to preserve and present the history of New Zealand military aviation for commemoration, learning, inspiration and enjoyment.

Overview
The Museum holds the national collection of the Royal New Zealand Air Force. The collection includes objects covering the early days of New Zealand military aviation both prior to World War I and during this major conflict, the interwar years which saw the formation of the RNZAF in 1937, New Zealanders who fought in the RAF and in other Allied air forces during World War II, the RNZAF's campaign in the Pacific, and the post-war period to the present day. The collection also includes objects from former enemy forces, aircraft, aircraft components, aircraft engines, large objects, textiles, art and memorabilia as well as an extensive paper and photographic archive.

Visitors can take a half-hour guided tour through 'behind the scenes' areas of the Museum, which includes the Reserve Collection hangar. The Museum's most recent restoration project, an Airspeed Oxford, is now on public display since February 2016. The Museum also has a Mosquito Flight Simulator, which features a mission based on the Allied bombing of German battleships in the Norwegian fiords.

In response to the 2011 earthquake, the museum opened its collections storage facility to other cultural institutions that had been damaged.

Aircraft

 Aermacchi MB-339CB NZ6460
 Airspeed Oxford PK286
 Auster T.7 NZ1707
 Avro 626 NZ203
 Avro Anson Composite
 BAC Strikemaster NZ6373
 Bell 47G-3 Sioux NZ3705
 Bell UH-1H Iroquois 69-15923
 Bell UH-1H Iroquois NZ3801
 Bleriot XI "Britannia" – Replica
 Boeing 727 NZ7272 – Forward fuselage, engine, main undercarriage
 Bristol Freighter Mk 31M NZ5903
 Cessna O-2A Skymaster 69-7639
 Curtiss P-40F Kittyhawk 41-14205
 de Havilland DH.82A Tiger Moth NZ1481
 de Havilland Vampire FB.5 NZ5757
 de Havilland Vampire T.11 NZ5710
 de Havilland Devon NZ1803
 de Havilland Canada DHC-2 Beaver 1084
 Douglas C-47B Dakota NZ3551
 GAF Canberra B.20 A84-240
 Grumman TBF-1C Avenger NZ2504
 Hawker Siddeley Andover C.1 NZ7621
 Kaman SH-2F Seasprite NZ3442
 Lockheed Hudson III NZ2013
 McDonnell Douglas A-4C Skyhawk NZ6205
 McDonnell Douglas A-4K Skyhawk NZ6207
 McDonnell Douglas TA-4K Skyhawk NZ6254
 North American Harvard III NZ1087
 North American P-51 Mustang F-367
 Pacific Aerospace CT-4B Airtrainer NZ1948
 Sopwith Pup – Replica
 Supermarine Spitfire XVI TE288
 Westland Wasp HAS.1 NZ3906

Under restoration 
 Canadian Vickers PBV-1A Catalina 44-34081
 Vickers Vildebeest/Vincent NZ102/NZ124/NZ105/NZ355/NZ357

References

External links

 Air Force Museum of New Zealand

Museums in Christchurch
Royal New Zealand Air Force
Aerospace museums in New Zealand
Air force museums
National museums of New Zealand
Museums established in 1987
Military and war museums in New Zealand
1987 establishments in New Zealand